Christer Winbäck (born 1953) is a Swedish Liberal People's Party politician, member of the Riksdag since 2002.

References

1953 births
Articles containing video clips
Living people
Members of the Riksdag 2002–2006
Members of the Riksdag 2006–2010
Members of the Riksdag 2010–2014
Members of the Riksdag from the Liberals (Sweden)